Bianca Knight (born January 2, 1989) is an American former track and field athlete who competed in the 100 and 200 meters. At the 2012 Summer Olympics she won a team event gold medal in the 4x100 metres relay team. In the final, the quartet of Tianna Madison, Allyson Felix, she and Carmelita Jeter broke a 27-year-old world record.

Career
Knight attended Ridgeland High School in Ridgeland, Mississippi and won the female Gatorade Athlete of the Year in track and field in 2006. She is the first Mississippi native to win a Gatorade Athlete of the Year award.
 
As a University of Texas freshman, Knight won the 2008 indoor NCAA 200 m championship in a collegiate-record time of 22.40. Turning professional following her freshman indoor campaign, she finished 5th at the 2008 US Olympic Trials in the 200 m. She won second stage of IAAF Diamond League, in the 200 m, in Rome, Golden Gala.

Knight competes professionally for Adidas.

References

External links 
 
 
 
 

1989 births
Living people
American female sprinters
African-American female track and field athletes
Track and field athletes from Mississippi
Texas Longhorns women's track and field athletes
Athletes (track and field) at the 2012 Summer Olympics
Olympic gold medalists for the United States in track and field
World Athletics Championships medalists
Medalists at the 2012 Summer Olympics
World Athletics record holders (relay)
People from Pearl, Mississippi
World Athletics Championships winners
Olympic female sprinters
21st-century African-American sportspeople
21st-century African-American women
20th-century African-American people
20th-century African-American women